Eucalyptus orophila is a species of small tree or shrub that is endemic to East Timor. It has rough, scaly, flaky bark on the lower part of the trunk, smooth bark above, egg-shaped to lance-shaped adult leaves, flower buds in groups of seven, white flowers and barrel-shaped to bell-shaped fruit.

Description
The bark is rough, scaly and flaky near the base, smooth and grey above.

Taxonomy and naming
Eucalyptus orophila was first formally described in 1995 by Lindsay Pryor from specimens collected near the summit of Mount Tata Mailau in East Timor and the description was published in Australian Systematic Botany. It is similar to E. urophylla but has leaves with a rounded rather than a pointed tip.

Distribution
This eucalypt is one of only four species only occurring outside Australia. It is only known from East Timor.

References

orophila
Plants described in 1995
Flora of East Timor